Anna Gerhardt (born 17 April 1998) is a German footballer who plays as a defender for 1. FFC Turbine Potsdam. She was youth international for Germany on several selection levels. She is the younger sister of Yannick Gerhardt.

Honours

Club
German football championship 2. Bundesliga Süd 2015 with the 1.FC Köln

International
 Nordic-Cup-Victress 2014 with the Nationalteam Germany U-16

Individual
Fritz Walter Medal: Silver 2016

References

External links

 Anna Gerhardt auf soccerdonna.de

1998 births
Living people
German women's footballers
FC Bayern Munich (women) players
1. FC Köln (women) players
Women's association football defenders
Frauen-Bundesliga players
People from Würselen
Sportspeople from Cologne (region)
Footballers from North Rhine-Westphalia
1. FFC Turbine Potsdam players